Tunnelvision is a 50 ft x 75 ft large trompe-l'œil painting, by Blue Sky, on a building in Columbia, South Carolina, USA, which shows a tunnel in original size. Tunnelvision looks very realistic.

External links 
 http://www.atlasobscura.com/places/tunnelvision

Murals in South Carolina
Culture of Columbia, South Carolina
Art in South Carolina